Peter Phillip Hitchcock AM (1944 – May 20, 2019) was a renowned Australian champion for nature conservation who played a key role establishing some of Australia's first rainforest protected areas, also overseeing nationally and internationally significant UNESCO World Heritage nominations plus World Heritage protected area management.

References

1944 births
2019 deaths
Australian environmentalists
Members of the Order of Australia